José Alberto de Paula Carmona (born March 4, 1990) is a Dominican professional baseball pitcher for the CTBC Brothers of the Chinese Professional Baseball League (CPBL). He has played in Major League Baseball (MLB) for the New York Yankees.

Career

San Diego Padres
De Paula began his career with the San Diego Padres organization. After the 2011 season, de Paula was added to the Padres' 40-man roster.

San Francisco Giants
After the 2013 season, the Padres waived de Paula, and he was claimed by the San Francisco Giants.

In 2014, de Paula suffered an oblique injury, and he did not pitch after July 23. The Giants designated de Paula for assignment on July 25, 2014.

New York Yankees
The Yankees signed de Paula to a major league contract after the 2014 season. He suffered a shoulder injury during spring training. When he returned, de Paula pitched to a 1.53 earned run average in three games started for the Scranton/Wilkes-Barre RailRiders of the Class AAA International League before the Yankees promoted him to the major leagues on June 17, 2015. He made his major league debut on June 21, 2015 against the Detroit Tigers. The first pitch he threw in his debut resulted in allowing a home run by Andrew Romine. It would be the only run he allowed in  innings pitched. A few hours after the game, he was optioned back down to Triple-A. He was designated for assignment on June 24, to create room on the 40-man roster for Iván Nova, who was activated from the disabled list. He elected free agency on November 6, 2015.

Ishikawa Million Stars
On March 13, 2017, he signed with the Ishikawa Million Stars of the Baseball Challenge League. He elected free agency on June 13.

Sultanes de Monterrey
On May 4, 2018, de Paula signed with the Sultanes de Monterrey of the Mexican Baseball League.

Bravos de León
On July 29, 2019, de Paula was traded to the Bravos de León of the Mexican League.

CTBC Brothers
On January 6, 2020, de Paula signed with the CTBC Brothers of the Chinese Professional Baseball League. He led the CPBL in wins (16), ERA (3.20), and strikeouts (192). dePaula also posted a 1.16 WHIP and accumulated a 4.21 WAR over 174.1 innings pitched. He was voted the league MVP for the 2020 season. de Paula was the Opening Day starting pitcher for the Brothers on March 13, 2021. He was once again stellar in his second season, posting a 16–4 record with a league-leading 1.77 ERA and 0.99 WHIP over 178.0 innings. The CTBC Brothers won the 2021 CPBL championship, and de Paula earned his second consecutive MVP award following the season.    

On October 8, 2021, de Paula signed a one-year contract extension with the team.

References

External links

1990 births
Living people
Arizona League Padres players
Bravos de León players
CTBC Brothers players
Dominican Republic expatriate baseball players in Japan
Dominican Republic expatriate baseball players in Mexico
Dominican Republic expatriate baseball players in Taiwan
Dominican Republic expatriate baseball players in the United States
Dominican Summer League Padres players
Eugene Emeralds players
Fresno Grizzlies players
Fort Wayne TinCaps players
Gigantes del Cibao players
Ishikawa Million Stars players
Lake Elsinore Storm players
Major League Baseball pitchers
Major League Baseball players from the Dominican Republic
Mexican League baseball pitchers
New York Yankees players
People from Santo Domingo Province
San Antonio Missions players
Scranton/Wilkes-Barre RailRiders players
Sultanes de Monterrey players